"Domani 21/04.09" is a charity single released by the supergroup Artisti Uniti per l'Abruzzo in 2009. The project supported the victims of the 2009 L'Aquila earthquake. The song is a cover of Mauro Pagani's "Domani", included in his 2003 album with the same title.

It received its first radio play on 6 May 2009 at 3:32, exactly one month after the L'Aquila earthquake. After peaking at number one on the Italian Singles Chart for 12 consecutive weeks, it became the best-selling single of the year in the country, receiving multiple-platinum certification by the Federation of the Italian Music Industry.

Background and recording

On 6 April 2009, an earthquake occurred in the region of Abruzzo, in central Italy, causing the death of more than 300 people. Wanting to support the reconstruction of the city, Italian singer Jovanotti decided to call his colleague and friend Giuliano Sangiorgi, leader of the band Negramaro. Sangiorgi later declared:

"We were thinking of what we could do, because for the first time the scenes broadcast by televisions didn't look distant, but extremely close to us and painful. In the beginning, we were thinking of a concert, but it looked to be something too 'joyous' in front of such a tragedy. Therefore, we thought we could record a song, calling Mauro [Pagani] as the producer, in order to avoid doing things too close to the disaster."

A few minutes later, Mauro Pagani was contacted and accepted to collaborate to the project. 
During the following days, the number of involved artists grew up to 56 different acts. Other artists, including Ivano Fossati, Fiorella Mannoia, and Subsonica, had to decline the invitation because they could not reach the remaining acts in Milan during the recording session of the song, which was decided to be held in one single place, the Officine Meccaniche Recording Studio in Milan, during one single day, 21 April 2009.

According to Jovanotti and Sangiorgi, the atmosphere during the recording process was "joyous and creative as if we were in a group of students. It looked like a demonstration. A historic day, or better, a dreamlike day."

Commercial performance
During the week ending on 14 May 2009, the song debuted at number one on the Italian Singles Chart, later holding the top spot for 12 consecutive weeks. During the week of 9 August 2009, the single fell to number two, behind "When Love Takes Over" by David Guetta and Kelly Rowland. It left the top twenty in mid-September 2009, after 18 consecutive weeks on the chart. According to the charts compiled by Nielsen for the Federation of the Italian Music Industry, "Domani 21/04.09" was the best-selling digital single of 2009 in Italy. The single was also certified multi-platinum for domestic downloads exceeding 60,000 units. In April 2010, it was announced that the single had sold 450,000 physical copies and 74,000 digital copies in Italy.

On 17 May 2009, the song also entered at number two on the Italian Music Control Airplay Chart, compiled by Nielsen, behind Gianna Nannini's "Attimo". During its second week, the song fell to number five, and it held the fifth spot in the week of 31 May 2009 too. On 7 June 2009, the song left the airplay top 5.

Track listing
 CD Single
 "Domani 21/04.09" – 6:12
 "Domani 21/04.09" (Instrumental) – 6:12

 Download
 "Domani 21/04.09" – 6:12

Personnel
Artisti Uniti per l'Abruzzo

 Afterhours
 Claudio Baglioni
 Franco Battiato
 Baustelle
 Samuele Bersani
 Bluvertigo
 Luca Carboni
 Caparezza
 Albano Carrisi
 Caterina Caselli
 Casino Royale
 Carmen Consoli
 Cesare Cremonini
 Dolcenera
 Elisa
 Elio e le Storie Tese
 Niccolò Fabi
 Fabri Fibra
 Giusy Ferreri
 Tiziano Ferro
 Eugenio Finardi
 Frankie Hi-NRG MC
 Giorgia
 Gianluca Grignani
 J-Ax
 Jovanotti
 Ligabue
 Malika Ayane
 Mango
 Gianni Maroccolo
 Marracash
 Morgan
 Gianni Morandi
 Gianna Nannini
 Negramaro
 Negrita
 Nek
 Niccolò Agliardi
 Pacifico
 Mauro Pagani
 Giuliano Palma
 Laura Pausini
 Roy Paci
 Piero Pelù
 Max Pezzali
 Massimo Ranieri
 Francesco Renga
 Ron
 Enrico Ruggeri
 Antonella Ruggiero
 Sud Sound System
 Tricarico
 Roberto Vecchioni
 Antonello Venditti
 Mario Venuti
 Zucchero

Musicians
 Saturnino Celani – bass guitar
 Cesareo (from Elio e le Storie Tese) – guitar
 Vittorio Cosma – Hammond organ
 Eros Cristiani – piano
 Joe Damiani – drums
 Franco "Francky" Li Causi (from Negrita) – bass guitar
 Cesare Mac Petricich (from Negrita) – guitar
 Andrea Mariano (from Negramaro) – keyboards
 Riccardo Onori – guitar
 Roy Paci – trumpet
 Mauro Pagani – violin
 Emanuele Spedicato (from Negramaro) – guitar
 Danilo Tasco (from Negramaro) – percussion instruments

Production
 Guido Andreani – engineer
 Antonio Baglio – mastering
 Jacopo Dorici – assistant
 Taketo Gohara – engineer
 Jovanotti – co-producer
 Mauro Pagani – producer
 Pino Pischetola – mixing
 Giuliano Sangiorgi – co-producer
 Marco Sorrentino – executive producer

Charts

Weekly charts

Year end charts

Release history

References

External links
 Official website

All-star recordings
Italian-language songs
Charity singles
2009 debut singles
Number-one singles in Italy
2009 songs
Sugar Music singles